The Way is a live album by soprano saxophonist Steve Lacy, which was recorded in Basel, Switzerland in 1979 and first released on the HatHut label in 1980 as a double LP. The album was rereleased as a double LP in 1985 and as a CD in 2000 with three additional tracks from the concert.

Reception

The Allmusic review by Scott Yanow stated "the many strong solos by Lacy and the highly underrated altoist Potts makes this two-fer of interest for followers of advanced jazz. This was always a well-organized and highly original group". On All About Jazz Francis Lo Kee said "The great Steve Lacy, recently departed, made many records, but this one captures a great ensemble at the peak of its creative powers ... it's hard to believe that so much great music was played in one sitting". Clifford Allen observed "The playful, off-kilter melodies that Lacy has a penchant for, deceptively simple repetitions of phrase and eloquent austerity, belie a Buddhist wit, and the way in which Lacy plays with composition and improvisation as though they were riddles for one another fits right into the jazz musician's koan".

Track listing
All compositions by Steve Lacy except where noted
 "Stamps" – 5:46 Additional track on CD reissue
 "Blinks" – 10:45 Additional track on CD reissue
 "Troubles" – 9:59 Additional track on CD reissue
 "Raps" – 11:31
 "Dreams" (Steve Lacy, Brion Gysin) – 9:17
 "Existence" – 8:40
 "The Way" – 9:56
 "Bone" – 7:45
 "Name" – 12:57
 "The Breath" – 12:00
 "Life On Its Way" – 11:05
 "Swiss Duck" – 5:53

Personnel
Steve Lacy – soprano saxophone, voice
Steve Potts – alto saxophone, soprano saxophone
Irene Aebi – cello, violin, voice
Kent Carter – bass
Oliver Johnson – drums

References

Steve Lacy (saxophonist) live albums
1980 live albums
Hathut Records live albums